Malte Lenz Gallée (born 5 September 1993) is a German politician from Alliance 90/The Greens. He has been a Member of the European Parliament since 2021. He took the place of Sven Giegold, who resigned as an MEP to join the domestic government following the 2021 German federal election,

References

See also 

 List of members of the European Parliament for Germany, 2019–2024

1993 births
Living people
21st-century German politicians
University of Bayreuth alumni
Alliance 90/The Greens politicians
Alliance 90/The Greens MEPs
MEPs for Germany 2019–2024